Crescent Enterprises is a multinational company headquartered in the United Arab Emirates. According to Crescent Enterprises, the company employs over 3,000 people in 22 subsidiaries and affiliates across 15 countries. Badr Jafar heads the company.

Crescent Enterprises is a subsidiary of the Crescent Group, a family business group operating in the MENA region since 1971. Crescent Group's other subsidiary, Crescent Petroleum, is an oil and gas company in the Middle East.

History
Crescent Enterprises was founded in 2007 as a subsidiary of the Crescent Group. The company has invested in companies such Growthgate Capital, TVM Capital Healthcare Partners, FIM-IBC MENA Real Estate Opportunities Fund, Siraj Palestine Fund I, Gama Aviation PLC, and Samena Limestone Holdings. In November 2017, the company announced plans to invest up to US$150 million (AED 550 million) over three years till 2020, making it one of the largest corporate venture units in the Middle East and North Africa. 

Crescent Enterprises includes companies such as the Gulftainer Group, Momentum Logistics, and Uruk Engineering & Contracting.

See also
Crescent Petroleum
Gulftainer

References

Companies based in the Emirate of Sharjah
Conglomerate companies of the United Arab Emirates
Emirati companies established in 2007
Conglomerate companies established in 2007